Mícheál Ó Cellaigh was an Irish scribe.

Mícheál Ó Cellaigh was a scribe, apparently based in Ballywinna, County Galway. He translated poems and songs by Antoine Ó Raifteiri; healso wrote down tales of the Fenians, and may have transcribed some material for Lady Gregory. He was one of a number of Galway scribes who collected and transmitted Irish literature and folklore in the county at the time, including Pádhraic Ó Comáin and Micheál Ó Conghaile

References

 Scríobhaithe Lámhscríbhinní Gaeilge I nGaillimh 1700-1900, William Mahon, in "Galway:History and Society", 1996

People from County Galway